Dyffryn Gwaun is a Site of Special Scientific Interest (SSSI) in Pembrokeshire, South Wales. It has been designated as a Site of Special Scientific Interest since January 1954 in an attempt to protect its fragile biological elements. The site has an area of 25.36 hectares and is managed by Natural Resources Wales.

Type and features
This site is designated due to its biological qualities. SSSIs in Wales have been notified for a total of 142 different animal species and 191 different plant species.

This site has 3 special features.
Woodland (semi-natural broadleaf)
Marshy grassland
Lichens typical of ancient woodland
The site has other habitats that contribute to the special wildlife interest including swamp and running water which support a wide range of species such as: otter, scarce flies and beetles.

See also
List of Sites of Special Scientific Interest in Pembrokeshire

References

External links
Natural Resources Wales website

Sites of Special Scientific Interest in Pembrokeshire
Valleys of Pembrokeshire